Eugénie Potonié-Pierre (1844–1898 Paris) was a French feminist who founded the Federation of French Feminist Societies in 1892.

She joined the Society for the Amelioration of Women's Condition with Léon Richer and Maria Deraismes in the 1870s. She served as the secretary and wrote for the organization's publication Le Droit des femmes (Women's Rights).
In 1880, with Léonie Rouzade, she founded Union des Femmes.

She was secretary of the  committee of the International Congress for Women's Rights, in 1892, and 1896. In her speech to the International Congress of 1896 in Berlin, Potonié-Pierre credited herself and French feminist peers with coining the term féminisme.

Death
She died June 12, 1898 from a cerebral hemorrhage at age 54. She is buried in Père Lachaise Cemetery.

Quote

References

French feminists
1844 births
1898 deaths